The New Social Democratic Party (Nova socijaldemokratska partija, NSDP) is a centre-left, social-democratic political party in North Macedonia. Its leader is Tito Petkovski, who parted with the Social Democratic Union of Macedonia in November 2005. 
In the 2006 parliamentary elections, it received 6% of the vote. In the 2016 parliamentary elections, it participated in an electoral coalition with SDSM and 15 other parties. The coalition won 436,981 votes and 49/120 MPs in Macedonian assembly.

References

External links
Official website (in Macedonian)
Extracts from the Statute of the NSDP

Pro-European political parties in North Macedonia
Socialist parties in North Macedonia
Social democratic parties